Green wattle may refer to:
 Acacia deanei
 Acacia decurrens, also known as Sydney green wattle
 Acacia filicifolia, also known as fern-leaved wattle
 Acacia irrorata, also known as Sydney green wattle
 Acacia mearnsii
 Acacia parramattensis, known as Parramatta green wattle or Sydney Green Wattle
 Acacia trineura

References